Toddy Pond is a pond in an enclosed basin on the rock flats 2 nautical miles (3.7 km) northwest of Flagship Mountain, in Convoy Range, Victoria Land, Antarctica. The name is in the nautical beverage theme similar to Rum Pond and Tot Pond in this range. Named by a 1989-90 New Zealand Antarctic Research Program (NZARP) field party.

Lakes of Victoria Land
Scott Coast